Why am I not where you are is a ballet commissioned by New York City Ballet and made by principal dancer Benjamin Millepied to a likewise commissioned score by French composer Thierry Escaich, The Lost Dancer.

It was the choreographer's second ballet for City Ballet; the premiere took place on Thursday, April 29, 2010, at the David H. Koch Theater, Lincoln Center. The costumes were designed by Marc Happel and the set by Santiago Calatrava as part of the company's Architecture of Dance Festival.

Original cast
 Kathryn Morgan
 Sara Mearns
 Sean Suozzi
 Amar Ramasar

Reviews 

  
 NY Times by Alastair Macaulay, May 1, 2010
 NY Times by Anthony Tommasini, June 11, 2010
 
 NY Times by Alastair Macaulay, July 2, 2010
 NY Times by Gia Kourlas, September 28, 2010

New York City Ballet repertory
Ballets by Benjamin Millepied
2010 ballet premieres
Ballets designed by Santiago Calatrava
Ballets designed by Marc Happel
Ballets by Thierry Escaich